Gestalt Therapy is a 1951 book that outlines an extension to psychotherapy, known as gestalt therapy, written by Frederick Perls, Ralph Hefferline, and Paul Goodman. Presented in two parts, the first introduces psychotherapeutic self-help exercises, and the second presents a theory of personality development and growth.

The book is known in the gestalt community as "PHG".

References

Bibliography

External links 

 

1951 non-fiction books
Books by Paul Goodman
Gestalt therapy
Psychology books
English-language books
American non-fiction books